Jean Ann LeGrand-Casarez ( LeGrand; born April 20, 1960) is an American lawyer and news correspondent for CNN and its sister network HLN. She formerly worked for TruTV until that network eliminated daytime trial coverage. As a correspondent for Court TV/TruTV, Casarez provided live daytime trial coverage, reporting on courtroom trials across the country; she covered such cases as the Coral Eugene Watts trial, the Kobe Bryant rape case, and Scott Peterson sentencing hearings. She was an anchor for Court TV's hourly Newsbreak. In addition to her current work for CNN, she is occasionally a substitute host for HLN's Current affairs show, Primetime Justice.

Career

A graduate of the University of Southern California and Southwestern Law School in Los Angeles, Casarez is a member of the Nevada and Texas bars, licensed in the Southern District of Texas Federal Court. She joined Court TV in January 2003 from KOLO-TV in Reno, Nevada, where she was a weekend anchor and legal reporter. Prior to working in Reno, Casarez produced the news magazine show First Edition and served as the City Hall reporter and fill-in anchor at KENS-TV in San Antonio, Texas.

In addition to her legal background and journalism career, Casarez, under the name Jean LeGrand, has recorded six albums of Tejano music in Spanish for the International divisions of CBS and Capitol EMI Records, thus touring throughout the U.S. and Mexico; Casarez has also been nominated for numerous awards as a journalist, and received a 2010 Peabody Award for CNN Network’s coverage of the Gulf Oil Spill.

Casarez is married and currently resides in New York City.

Discography (partial) (as Jean LeGrand)
 Tirano (CBS International, 1987) 
 Jean Le Grand (EMI Latin, 1990)
 It Takes 2 Duets (EMI Latin, 1991)
 Enamorada (EMI Latin, 1992)
 Todo Para Ti (EMI Latin, 1994)

References

CNN people
Living people
American reporters and correspondents
University of Southern California alumni
People from California
People from Long Beach, California
Southwestern Law School alumni
American television journalists
1960 births
American women television journalists
American television personalities of Mexican descent
American women singers
American musicians of Mexican descent
Tejano pop musicians
Spanish-language singers of the United States
American women lawyers
Lawyers from New York City
21st-century American women